Sari Aghol (also Romanized as Sārī Āghol; also known as Sar Āghol and Sarāghol) is a village in Charuymaq-e Jonubegharbi Rural District, in the Central District of Charuymaq County, East Azerbaijan Province, Iran. At the 2006 census, its population was 78, in 12 families.

References 

Populated places in Charuymaq County